The 1976 PGA Tour season was played from January 8 to November 7. The season consisted of 45 official money events. Ben Crenshaw, Johnny Miller, and Hubert Green won the most tournaments, three, and there were eight first-time winners. Hubert Green's wins were in three consecutive weeks in March. Johnny Miller won the first event of the year for the third consecutive year. The tournament results and award winners are listed below.

Schedule
The following table lists official events during the 1976 season.

Unofficial events
The following events were sanctioned by the PGA Tour, but did not carry official money, nor were wins official.

Awards

Notes

External links
PGA Tour official site
1976 season coverage at golfstats.com

PGA Tour seasons
PGA Tour